Dasht Gorgan (also Romanized as Dasht Gorgān) is a village in Jeyransu Rural District, in the Central District of Maneh and Samalqan County, North Khorasan Province, Iran. At the 2006 census, its population was 60, in 19 families.

References 

Populated places in Maneh and Samalqan County